The 1972 Rice Owls football team was an American football team that represented Rice University in the Southwest Conference during the 1972 NCAA University Division football season. In their first year under head coach Al Conover, the team compiled a 5–5–1 record.

Schedule

References

Rice
Rice Owls football seasons
Rice Owls football